La Iglesia de El Sagrario, or La Iglesia del Sagrario (Spanish, “Church of the Sanctuary” or “Church of the Shrine”) may refer to: 

Iglesia de El Sagrario, Quito, Ecuador, a chapel attached to the Quito Cathedral
Iglesia del Sagrario in Cuenca or Old Cathedral of Cuenca, a museum in Cuenca, Ecuador
Iglesia del Sagrario, Jaén, Spain, a chapel attached to the Jaén Cathedral
 Iglesia del Sagrario, in Málaga, Spain
 Catedral e Iglesia del Sagrario, Granada, Spain

See also
 Catedral El Sagrario, Rancagua, Chile